The Vietnamese Women's National League, officially the Women's National League, also called the Thai Son Bac Cup for sponsorship reasons, is the highest league of women's football in Vietnam. The league was established in 1998 and is currently contested by 8 teams. Hanoi and Ho Chi Minh City have won the Vietnamese Women's National League the most, winning the title 10 times.

History
In 1998, the first tournament was held with two teams involved: Ho Chi Minh City and Hanoi. Hanoi won the league's first championship and also holds the record of ten championships. Currently the tournament involves 8 teams. The Vietnamese Women's National League was the first football tournament for women in Southeast Asia. However, it is not under the direct jurisdiction of the Vietnam Football Federation, thus the league is entirely made up of amateur or semi-professional players.

In 2022, shortly after the senior side qualified for the 2023 FIFA Women's World Cup, a historic moment occurred when two players from Ho Chi Minh City (Nguyễn Thị Mỹ Anh, Lê Hoài Lương) transferred to Thai Nguyen and were given opportunities with professional contracts, the first in Vietnam's women's football history. After VFF intervention by request of Ho Chi Minh City, the transfers were able to continue after the South Vietnamese club secured a guarantee. It was considered a watershed moment for Vietnamese women's football due to its amateur/semi-professional status, sparked debates about whenever Vietnam's women's football league should be reorganised and enter the new professional era.

Format
Teams play each other two times per season on a weekly basis. The team with the most wins after that is the champion. In order from high to low, the tiebreakers are:
 most wins
 better in direct matches
 most goals

Clubs

Champions

Teams reaching the top three

Individual awards

See also
 AFC Women's Club Championship

References

External links
 Official site
 League at soccerway.com

women
Vietnam
Sports leagues established in 1998
1998 establishments in Vietnam
1
Women's sports leagues in Vietnam